Two total lunar eclipses occurred in 1953: 

 29 January 1953 lunar eclipse
 26 July 1953 lunar eclipse

See also 
 List of 20th-century lunar eclipses
 Lists of lunar eclipses